Bacharach, also Bachrach, is a German surname, mostly Jewish, referring to the medieval town of Bacharach. Notable people with this surname include the following:

Abraham Samuel Bacharach (–1615), German Rabbi
Arthur J. Bachrach (1926–2011), American psychologist
Bernard S. Bachrach (born 1939), American historian
Bill Bachrach (1879–1959), American swimming and water polo coach
Burt Bacharach (1928–2023), American composer, songwriter, and pianist
Emanuel Bachrach-Barée (1863–1943), German painter
Eva Bacharach (–1651), Hebraist and rabbinical scholar
Harry Bacharach (1873–1947), American politician and mayor of Atlantic City, New Jersey
Howard Bachrach (1920–2008), American scientist
Isaak Bacharach (1854–1942), German mathematician
Isaac Bacharach (1870–1956), American politician from New Jersey who represented the 2nd congressional district from 1915 to 1937
Jacob ben Moses Bachrach (1824–1896), Polish rabbi
Louis Fabian Bachrach Jr. (1917–2010), American photographer
Marion Bachrach (1898–1957), American Communist activist in the 1930s
Raymond Louis Bacharach (born 1945), German pornographer known as John Thompson of "JT Productions"
Robert E. Bacharach (born 1959), American judge
Shel Bachrach (born 1944), American insurance broker, investor, businessman and philanthropist
Steven Bachrach, organic chemist
Walt Bachrach (1904–1989), American politician, mayor of Cincinnati, Ohio in the 1960s
Yair Bacharach (1639–1702), German rabbi

German-language surnames
Ashkenazi surnames